Yoo An-Jin (This is the author's preferred Romanization per LTI Korea, or Hangul: 유안진) is a South Korean poet, essayist, and professor.

Life

Yoo An-Jin was born April 21, 1941 in Andong, Gyeongsangbuk-do. Yu graduated from Seoul National University Teacher's College's Department of Education and then received her graduate degree and Ph.D. in Education from the University of Florida. She has taught at Dankook University and Seoul National University. Her literary debut was in 1965.

Work

Yu first became famous for  her essays, beginning with her contribution to the prose collection Dreaming of a Beautiful Friendship (Jiranjigyo leul ggum ggumyeo, 지란지교를 꿈꾸며, 1986). The book, which also included essays by Yi Hyang-a and Gim Dal-jin, met with great popular acclaim, and made her name practically a household word. The lyrical style of her essays won her the hearts of many sensitive middle and high school students. This led to Yu's expanding her talent to other literary genres including educational essays such as "Child Education in Traditional Korean Society."

Yu has carried out various aesthetic experiments in her attempts to establish a position and identity for contemporary woman. She attempts to casts a soft revelatory light on areas of society which have gone unnoticed. Her poetic voice, most often a mother, wife, sister or daughter-in-law, speak to the reader in a soft tone, while closely observing the world around them to seek salvation in their complex lives.

Yu spares little effort to discover the true self hidden in the small things in daily life. Her efforts to resolve tensions between self and world through the exploration of various modes of women's lives, is not a coarse chanting of slogans, but declarations of a poetic nature, communicated softly, like whispers. This only adds to their persuasiveness.

Yu has received many awards including the 1990 간행물윤리위원회 간행물 윤리상, the 1996 12회 펜문학상, the 1998 10th Jeong Ji-young Literature Prize, the  2000 35th Woltan Literature Prize (2003), and the 2012 44th Korean Poet's Association Prize.

Works in translation
 春雨一袋子 (유안진 시선집-봄비 한 주머니)

Works in Korean (partial)
Poetry Collections
 Beneath the Moon (Dalha)
 Poems of Despair (Jeolmangsipyeon)
 To the Water, to the Wind (Mullo balameuro)
 Winged Vestments (Nalgaeot)
 Christ, My Love of Old (Geuriseudo, yet aein)
 Melody Drenched in Moonlight (Dalbiche jeonneun garak)
 Everlasting Exclamation (Yeongwonhan neukkimpyo)
Personal Essays
 Dreaming of a Good and Noble Friendship (Jiranjigyoreul kkumkkumyeo)
 In Search of the Scars of My Soul (Nae yeonghonui sangcheoreul chajaseo)
 Fragrance! O Fragrance of Love! (Hyanggiyeo sarangui hyanggiyeo).

Awards
 1990	간행물윤리위원회 간행물 윤리상
 1996	제12회 펜문학상
 1998	10th Jeong Ji-young Literature Prize
 2000	35th Woltan Literature Prize
 2012      44th Korean Poet's Association Prize

References 

1941 births
Korean writers
Living people
Society of Korean Poets Award winners